Cynthia A. Stark is a professor in the Department of Philosophy at the University of Utah, who has written on the effects of gaslighting and argues that pornography is a distinct act of harm.

Selected publications

References

External links
 Cynthia A. Stark Curriculum Vitae
Google scholar

Date of birth unknown
University of Utah alumni
University of Utah faculty
American women writers
American feminists
Year of birth missing (living people)
Living people
21st-century American women writers